Twistie or twisties may refer to:

 Twist tie, a type of re-usable fastener
 Twisties, a snack food made by Smith's Snackfood Company
 Twisties, also known as the yips, a sudden loss of a gymnast's ability to maintain body control during aerial maneuvers
 In glass art, a type of lamp blowing raw material glass rod formed from twisted strands of coloured glass
 In computing, a user interface with a triangle shape that twists to reveal more data

See also
 Twist (disambiguation)
 Twisted (disambiguation)